Phoebe Sarah Nicholls (born 7 April, 1957) is an English film, television, and stage actress. She is known for her roles as Cordelia Flyte in Brideshead Revisited and as the mother of John Merrick in The Elephant Man.

Personal life
Nicholls  is the daughter of actors Anthony Nicholls and Faith Kent. She trained at the Central School of Speech and Drama. Nicholls married director Charles Sturridge on 6 July 1985; they have two sons, Tom and Arthur, and a daughter Matilda. Her grandfather is photojournalist Horace Nicholls.

Career
As a child actress in several films she was billed as Sarah Nicholls. In her early 20s, she appeared in David Lynch's The Elephant Man (1980), Richard Loncraine's The Missionary (1982) and as Cordelia Flyte in Brideshead Revisited (1981). Since then, she has worked almost exclusively in television and theatre. Cast in Michael Lindsay-Hogg's original staging of Whose Life Is It Anyway? in 1978, she later performed in Robert Strura's revival of Three Sisters with Vanessa Redgrave, Stephen Daldry's acclaimed National Theatre version of J.B. Priestley's An Inspector Calls and in the Olivier Award-winning productions of Pravda, with The Elephant Man co-star Sir Anthony Hopkins and Terry Johnson's Hysteria. Her supporting performances in the 2008 West End revivals of Noël Coward's The Vortex and Harley Granville Barker's Waste earned her the 2009 Clarence Derwent Award from Equity. She also played the conniving art critic Rivera in the National Theatre production of the Howard Barker drama, Scenes from an Execution.

Nicholls appeared in the BBC film Persuasion (1995), an adaptation of Jane Austen's novel. She has made guest appearances on several television mystery series, including Kavanagh QC, Prime Suspect, Midsomer Murders, Lewis, The Ruth Rendell Mysteries ("May and June", 1997), Foyle's War, Second Sight starring Clive Owen, and the 2012 Christmas episode of Downton Abbey, a role she reprised for the 2014 season. She has also appeared in several works directed by her husband, Charles Sturridge, including his 1995 television adaptation of Gulliver's Travels, where she portrayed the Liliputian Empress, the 1997 film Fairy Tale: A True Story and Shackleton in 2002.

Filmography

Film

Television

Stage

 1978: Whose Life Is It Anyway?
 1981: The Cherry Orchard
 1983: The Beautiful Part of Myself
 1984: Pravda
 1985: The Seagull
 1991: Three Sisters
 1993: An Inspector Calls
 1993: Hysteria
 1994: Rutherford & Son
 1997: Dona Rosita the Spinster
 2005: Three Women and a Piano Tuner
 2007: The Vortex
 2008: Waste
 2009: When the Rain Stops Falling
 2012: Scenes from an Execution
 2022: The Southbury Child

References

External links

1957 births
20th-century English actresses
21st-century English actresses
Actresses from London
Alumni of the Royal Central School of Speech and Drama
Clarence Derwent Award winners
English film actresses
English stage actresses
English television actresses
Living people
English child actresses